is a Prefectural Natural Park in southeast Aomori Prefecture, Japan. Established in 1953, the park spans the borders of the municipalities of Hachinohe and Hashikami. In 2013 the park was incorporated into Sanriku Fukkō National Park.

See also
 National Parks of Japan

References

Parks and gardens in Aomori Prefecture
Hachinohe
Hashikami, Aomori
Protected areas established in 1953
1953 establishments in Japan